Calvin Johnson (born 1985) is a former American football wide receiver for the Detroit Lions of the National Football League.

Calvin Johnson may also refer to:
Calvin Johnson (Marvel Cinematic Universe)
Calvin Johnson (musician) (born 1962), American musician and record label owner
Calvin A. Johnson Jr. (born 1985), New Orleans jazz musician and actor
Calvin B. Johnson, Pennsylvania politician
Calvin C. Johnson (born 1929), Ohio politician
Calvin D. Johnson (1898–1985), U.S. Representative from Illinois
Calvin R. Johnson (1822–1897), Wisconsin legislator